Adventures on the Lido (German: Abenteuer am Lido) is a 1933 Austrian musical comedy film directed by Richard Oswald and starring Alfred Piccaver, S.Z. Sakall and Nora Gregor. Because Oswald was a Jew, both this and another film of his were denied permission to be shown in Nazi Germany.

Partial cast
 Alfred Piccaver as Gennaro Mattei 
 S.Z. Sakall as Michael  
 Nora Gregor as Evelyn Norman 
 Walter Rilla as Leonard 
 Susi Lanner as Mitzi 
 Hermine Sterler as Lucena 
 John Mylong
 Eugen Jensen

References

Bibliography
 Kohl, Katrin & Robertson, Ritchie. A History of Austrian Literature 1918-2000. Camden House, 2006.

External links

1933 films
1933 musical comedy films
Austrian musical comedy films
1930s German-language films
Films directed by Richard Oswald
Austrian multilingual films
Films with screenplays by Franz Schulz
Austrian black-and-white films
1933 multilingual films
Films set in Italy